"Margaritaville" is a song by Jimmy Buffett. 

Margaritaville may also refer to:

Jimmy Buffett's Margaritaville, Jimmy Buffett's holding company
Radio Margaritaville, an internet radio station
Meet Me in Margaritaville: The Ultimate Collection, a greatest hits album by Jimmy Buffett released in 2003
Margaritaville Records, Jimmy Buffett's vanity label; see Margaritaville Cafe: Late Night
"Margaritaville" (South Park), a 2009 episode of South Park

See also
Margaritaville Casino (disambiguation)